Cryptoclidus is a genus of plesiosaur reptile from the Middle Jurassic period of England, France, and Cuba.

Discovery 
Cryptoclidus was a plesiosaur whose specimens include adult and juvenile skeletons, and remains which have been found in various degrees of preservation in England, Northern France, Russia, and South America. Its name, meaning "hidden clavicles", refer to its small, practically invisible clavicles buried in its front limb girdle.

The type species was initially described as Plesiosaurus eurymerus by Phillips (1871). The specific name "wide femur" refers to the forelimb, which was mistaken for a hindlimb at the time. Fossils of Cryptoclidus have been found in the Oxford Clay of Cambridgeshire, England. The dubious species Cryptoclidus beaugrandi is known from Kimmeridgian-age deposits in Boulogne-sur-Mer, France. Cryptoclidus vignalensis, which is now considered undiagnostic, hails from the Jagua Formation of western Cuba.

Description 

The fragile build of the head and teeth preclude any grappling with prey, and suggest a diet of small, soft-bodied animals such as squid and shoaling fish. Cryptoclidus may have used its long, intermeshing teeth to strain small prey from the water, or perhaps sift through sediment for buried animals.

The size and shape of the nares and nasal openings have led Brown and Cruickshank (1994) to argue that they were used to sample seawater for smells and chemical traces.

Classification 

The cladogram below follows the topology from Benson et al. (2012) analysis.

See also 
 List of plesiosaur genera
 Timeline of plesiosaur research

References

Further reading 
 Z. Gasparini and L. Spaletti. 1993. First Callovian plesiosaurs from the Neuquen Basin, Argentina. Ameghiniana 30(3):245-254

External links 

 Paleos Vertebrates - Cryptocleidoidea
 Plesiosaur names and Pronunciation guide

Cryptoclidids
Callovian life
Middle Jurassic plesiosaurs of Europe
Jurassic England
Fossils of England
Oxford Clay
Jurassic Cuba
Fossils of Cuba
Fossil taxa described in 1892
Taxa named by Harry Seeley
Sauropterygian genera